Necropolis is a 1970 Italian-British fantasy horror film directed by Franco Brocani. A dissertation on human evil through the ages, it is considered a cult film, and it was referred to as "a fusion between an Andy Warhol-style improvisation and an ambitious, esoteric subtext that summons all the Western counterculture of the time".

Plot

Shown through a series of loosely connected vignettes of figures from humanity's past, from Attila the Hun, to the "Blood Countess" Elizabeth Bathory, all of which depict various acts of evil both physical and metaphysical.

Cast 
 Pierre Clémenti as Attila  
 Viva as Countess Bathory  
 Carmelo Bene as Devil
 Bruno Corazzari as Frankenstein's Monster
 Tina Aumont 
 Nicoletta Machiavelli 
 Paul Jabara  
 Paolo Graziosi 
 Louis Waldon 
 Aldo Mondino  
 Rada Rassimov  
 George Willing

Critical reception

Time Out praised the film, commending the film's range, score, and Brocani's "contemplative" approach to the material.

References

External links
 
 
 
 

1970 films
1970s avant-garde and experimental films
1970s fantasy films
1970 horror films
British avant-garde and experimental films
British fantasy films
British horror films
Cultural depictions of Elizabeth Báthory
Dark fantasy films
1970s English-language films
1970s Italian-language films
Italian avant-garde and experimental films
Italian fantasy films
Italian horror films
1970 directorial debut films
1970 multilingual films
British multilingual films
Italian multilingual films
1970s British films
1970s Italian films